Sugar River flows into the Black River near Boonville, New York.

References 

Rivers of Oneida County, New York
Rivers of New York (state)
Rivers of Lewis County, New York